Banshee (Sean Cassidy) is a fictional superhero appearing in American comic books published by Marvel Comics, commonly in association with the X-Men. Created by writer Roy Thomas and artist Werner Roth, the character first appeared in X-Men #28 (Jan. 1967).

An Irish mutant, Banshee possesses a "sonic scream", capable of harming enemies’ auditory systems and causing physical vibrations. He is named after the banshee, a legendary female spirit from Irish mythology, (Bean Sí, literally Fairy Woman), said to possess a haunting cry.

A former Interpol agent and NYPD police officer, Banshee was always a decade older than most of the X-Men and had only a relatively short tenure as a full-time X-Man. He was a mentor of the 1990s-era junior team Generation X.

Caleb Landry Jones played the role of Banshee in 2011's X-Men: First Class.

Publication history
Banshee was created by writer Roy Thomas and artist Werner Roth, and first appeared in X-Men #28 (Jan. 1967). Thomas originally conceived of the character as a woman, but editor Stan Lee thought that it wouldn't look good for an entire team to gang up on a female villain.

When the character first appeared, he acted as an adversary to the X-Men under coercion, but soon befriended the team and eventually appeared as a member of the X-Men in Giant-Size X-Men #1 (May 1975). The character was forced to leave the team when his superpowers were damaged in battle in The Uncanny X-Men #119 (March 1979), and remained an occasional supporting character for the team for several years. Banshee eventually healed fully, and rejoined the team in Uncanny X-Men #254 (December 1989) for a short stint, later becoming a central figure in the title Generation X, which lasted from 1994 to 2001. Banshee was killed in issue #2 of the 2006 X-Men: Deadly Genesis limited series.

Banshee was one of the feature characters in the 2011 two-issue limited series Chaos War: X-Men.

Fictional character biography
Sean Cassidy is discovered by the villainous Changeling, who invites him to join Factor Three. Cassidy declines upon learning Factor Three's goals. Factor Three, along with the Ogre, captures him and places a headband containing explosives around his head to force him to obey their commands. Codenamed after the banshee, a spirit from Irish mythology, Cassidy is forced to perform various criminal missions for Factor Three. On a mission in New York City, Banshee encounters the X-Men. Professor X uses his telepathy to disarm the headband and remove it, allowing Banshee to help the X-Men defeat Factor Three.

Later, Factor Three captures him again but he helps the X-Men defeat Factor Three's ally, the Mutant Master. The Sentinels capture him, but he is released from their captivity. While on the run from the Secret Empire, he fights Captain America and the Falcon, mistaking their then-fugitive status for a link to his pursuers.

Banshee joins the second group of X-Men. After a mission at Krakoa, Banshee remains with the "New X-Men". Banshee accompanies the team on many different missions and is present for several key moments in the X-Men's history, including the first death of an X-Man, Thunderbird. He is also a key player during the first appearance of the Phoenix and the team's first encounter with the Shi'ar. While with the X-Men, he falls in love with Xavier's ex-girlfriend, Dr. Moira MacTaggert. Alongside the X-Men, he fights his cousin Black Tom Cassidy and the Juggernaut. Given his age, he frequently acts as a confidant for both Xavier and Cyclops, eventually convincing Cyclops to change his leadership style to better suit the older, more experienced second team of X-Men.

When Banshee loses the use of his powers due to damaged vocal cords, he leaves the X-Men to stay with MacTaggert.

Meanwhile, Black Tom was secretly raising Banshee's daughter, Theresa. She develops sonic powers of her own and adopts the name Siryn. Siryn assists Black Tom with his crimes until the pair is defeated by Spider-Woman and the X-Men. While in custody, Tom makes arrangements for Siryn to be reunited with her father.

Banshee's powers gradually return as he heals and he remains an ally of the X-Men. He reveals an encounter with Wolverine that occurred before either of them joined the X-Men. Eventually, Sean regains full use of his sonic powers. After the dissolution of the team following a botched mission, Banshee is instrumental in piecing the X-Men back together. When his jaw is broken, he leaves the X-Men again and returns to MacTaggert.

He later becomes the head of the new team of young mutants Generation X along with Emma Frost.

He reappears again as the leader of X-Corps, the new team of apparently reformed mutants criminals.

He dies trying to prevent a plane crash caused by Vulcan.

In his will, Cassidy gives his daughter the family castle—Cassidy Keep—as well as his pipe. When Siryn and Jamie Madrox have a child, they name him Sean in honor of her late father.

Cassidy has been resurrected under the control of villains twice, before being restored to life by a Celestial Death Seed. He is recruited by the Apocalypse Twins as part of their new Horsemen of Death. Following the Apocalypse Twins' defeat, Banshee is in the X-Men's custody and placed in the medical bay of Avengers Mansion. Beast concludes that healing Banshee of the Death Seed energy that made him a Horseman of Death will take years and highly advanced technology.

Sean later resurfaced as part of the Mutant Liberation Front along with Hope Summers. After a confrontation with the X-Men and newest incarnation of the Brotherhood of Mutants, Sean rejoined the X-Men. When attacking the O*N*E headquarters, he was caught with a huge, big weapon like a hulk killer. The machine eventually exploded as X-Men screamed out in sadness as they knew the explosion caused his death.

House of X
Sean later appeared alive and completely cured of the Death Seed energy. He was seen standing in a yellow uniform and waiting to go through the portal to their new home now that the mutant population has sharply increased across the globe thanks to the sentient mutant island Krakoa and its special flowers. Krakoa has now become an independent island-state off the coasts of East Asia and Australia. He later reunites with his daughter Siryn on Krakoa as well.

Banshee was in the running to join the first Krakoan X-Men lineup but lost to Polaris.

Some time later, Moira finally revealed herself to Sean in an Irish Pub. She wanted him to help her sneak into Krakoa, but Sean, who still couldn't believe she was alive, wanted to take things slow and get her to a hospital first. Losing her patience, Moira decided to cut their reunion short and kill him, ripping his face off to enter the island undercover. Sean was revived by the Five but was deeply troubled by his misfortunes and this was made worse when he was temporarily possessed by "The Skinjacker", struggling to overcome the treachery of his loved one, he was coerced into making a deal with the mysterious "Mother Righteous" who gave him powers similar to Ghost Rider. After using these new powers to save Nightcrawler, Blindfold and Weaponless Zsen from the astral plane, he was reported by Professor X to have been appearing in the dreams of his closest circle calling himself Vox Ignis, Herald of the Spark. He was later seen observing things with Mother Righteous in the Astral Plane, it was revealed that she had bonded him to the Spirit of Variance a rejected Spirit of Vengeance. After getting them both to thank her for her service, they discussed future plans and she told him to keep an eye on Legion because a new threat was coming.

Powers and abilities
Banshee is a mutant whose superhumanly powerful lungs, throat, and vocal cords can produce a sonic scream for various effects, in concert with limited, reflexive psionic powers which directed his sonic vibrations. He can hover or fly at the speed of sound, and can carry at least one passenger. He could overwhelm listeners with deafening noise, stun them with tight-focus low-frequency sonic blasts (effective even against shielded ears by penetrating the skull via bone conduction), plunge them into a hypnotic trance, disorient them, nauseate them, or simply render them unconscious. Using sonic waves, he can rapidly vibrate himself or other masses at will. He could generate sonic blasts which struck with tremendous concussive force, liquefying or outright disintegrating targets at his highest levels of power. By radiating sound waves outward and reading the feedback, he can locate and analyze unseen objects in a sonar-like fashion. By modulating his scream's harmonics, he can confuse most scanning equipment. He can instinctively analyze, replicate, and block sonic waves or vibrations from other sources.

Banshee generates a psionic field which protects him from the detrimental effects of his sonic vibrations, though his sonic powers can still injure him when pushed beyond safe limits. For a while, his sonic powers were gone after having to use them up and down the harmonic scale to stop a weapon of Moses Magnum's. His physiology seems fully vulnerable to conventional injury when his sonic powers are not engaged. Banshee has selective hearing, enabling him to focus upon, enhance, or totally block out any given sound in his environment; this shields him from the deafening sound of his own screams, and make him a superhumanly acute eavesdropper in surveillance situations. Sean and his cousin Black Tom are immune to each other's natural mutant energy powers, though Sean's immunity does not extend to the new powers Tom later developed via artificial mutations.

A gifted detective, veteran undercover operative, and formidable unarmed combatant, Cassidy is an excellent marksman and a competent amateur machine-smith, well-versed in combat strategy & tactics, and teamwork drills, from his training at Interpol. An effective educator, organizer, and lobbyist, he is also an avid American country music aficionado and skillful amateur piano player. As Cassidy, he wields conventional firearms, sometimes loaded with explosive "micro-bombs." As Banshee, he wears synthetic costuming designed to resist air friction, usually including underarm wings that helped him glide on air currents and his own sonic waves. The "ribbons" on Banshee's costume (a visual trademark of the character) aid him in his flight.

Reception
 In 2014, Entertainment Weekly ranked Banshee 49th in their "Let's rank every X-Man ever" list.

Other versions

Ultimate Marvel
In the Ultimate Marvel universe, Banshee is the name of a drug similar to Mutant Growth Hormone. The drug was being made and distributed by Moira MacTaggert, who displayed the powers of Earth-616's Sean Cassidy, which was later used by Alpha Flight, Cyclops, and Colossus.

Age of Apocalypse
In the Age of Apocalypse, Banshee had a close bond with Quicksilver. Over the course of events in those comics, he fights the Horseman Abyss twice, the second time sacrificing his life to destroy the dangerous mutant.

Marvel Noir
In X-Men Noir, Sean Cassidy is depicted as a heroin dealer and an inmate at Welfare Pen and one of Angel's childhood acquaintances.

Renew Your Vows
In the pages of Amazing Spider-Man: Renew Your Vows, Banshee is briefly seen escaping the Brotherhood of Mutants to warn the X-Men about Jubilee being a traitor. He is confronted by Magneto and is crushed by a shipping container.

In other media

Television
Banshee appears in X-Men: The Animated Series. This version is the younger brother of Black Tom Cassidy, an associate of the X-Men, and in a romantic relationship with Moira MacTaggert.

Film
 Banshee appears in Generation X, portrayed by Jeremy Ratchford. This version is a laid-back headmaster of Xavier's School for Gifted Youngsters whose sonic scream can stun targets.
 Banshee appears in X-Men: First Class, portrayed by Caleb Landry Jones, though Robert Sheehan was originally cast in the role before he was forced to drop out due to scheduling conflicts with the TV series Misfits. This version hails from 1962 and is recruited by Charles Xavier and Erik Lehnsherr to help them defeat the Hellfire Club.
 While Jones did not reprise his role as Banshee in X-Men: Days of Future Past, Lehnsherr states he was one of several mutants who were captured, experimented on, and killed by Bolivar Trask.

Video games
 Banshee appears as a NPC in X-Men Legends II: Rise of Apocalypse, voiced by Quinton Flynn.
 Banshee appears in Magneto's ending in Marvel vs. Capcom 3: Fate of Two Worlds.

Merchandise
 Banshee received a figure in Toy Biz's X-Men figure line.
 Banshee received a figure in series two of Toy Biz's "Generation X" toy line.
 Banshee received a figure in Marvel Legends' Annihilus build-a-figure series.
 Banshee received a figure in the Classic Marvel Figurine Collection.

References

External links
 Banshee at Marvel.com
 Banshee at Marvel Wiki
 UncannyXmen.Net's Spotlight on Banshee

Characters created by Roy Thomas
Comics characters introduced in 1967
Fictional characters who can manipulate sound
Fictional government agents
Fictional immigrants to the United States
Fictional Irish people
Fictional detectives
Fictional principals and headteachers
Fictional schoolteachers
Irish superheroes
Male characters in film
Marvel Comics film characters
Marvel Comics male superheroes
Marvel Comics martial artists
Marvel Comics mutants
Marvel Comics police officers
X-Men members